Musiał or Musial (Polish pronunciation: , feminine: Musiała/ Musiala, plural: Musiałowie) is a Polish surname meaning "he had to", from the past tense of the Polish word . An equivalent surname in Czech is Musil. Notable people with this surname include:

Adam Musiał (born 1948), Polish football player and manager
Bogdan Musiał (born 1960), Polish historian
Maciej Musiał (born 1995), Polish actor
Mariusz Musial (born 1978), Norwegian athlete
Stan Musial (1920–2013), American baseball player
Stanisław Musiał (1938–2004), Polish writer
Władysław Musiał, Polish football player
Joe Musial (1905–1977), American cartoonist
Jamal Musiala (born 2003), German footballer

See also
 
Musil
Musiol

References

Polish-language surnames